Nancy Meckler is an American theatre and film director, known for her work in the United Kingdom with Shared Experience, where she was a joint artistic director alongside Polly Teale.

Life and career

Nancy Meckler was born and educated in the US, where she obtained a master's degree in Performance Theory and Criticism from NYU. She moved to London in 1968 where she became a founder member of Freehold Theatre Company (1968–72) which toured the UK with Antigone in a version by Peter Hulton and the company. In 1970, Antigone was sent by the British Council to represent the UK at BITEF and the Venice Biennale. The Freehold Theatre Company won the John Whiting Award for New Writing in 1970.

Meckler was the first woman to direct at the Royal National Theatre, with Edward Albee's Who’s Afraid of Virginia Woolf? in 1981.

She was the artistic director of Shared Experience Theatre from 1988 to 2011. Meckler has directed 5 plays at the Royal Shakespeare Company as well as King Lear at Shakespeare's Globe.

Directing Credits

As a Freelance Director 1972 - 2000 

 Eight Sam Shepard plays (including world premieres of Killers Head, Action, Curse of the Starving Class, and A Particle of Dread: Oedipus Variations)
 Uncle Vanya by Anton Chekov - Hampstead Theatre, 1979.
 Dusa, Fish, Stas and Vi by Pam Gems – Hampstead Theatre and West End, 1976.
 Sufficient Carbohydrate by Dennis Potter - Hampstead Theatre and West End, 1984.
 Low Level Panic by Clare McIntyre - Royal Court Theatre Upstairs and Lyric Hammersmith, 1988. 
 St Joan by George Bernard Shaw - Cambridge Theatre Company tour.
 Rose by Martin Sherman - National Theatre and Broadway (Lincoln Centre, 2000).

As Artistic Director of Shared Experience Theatre 1988-2011 

 The Bacchae - Edinburgh Festival, UK tour, 1988.
 Abingdon Square by Maria Irene Fornes - Soho Poly (1989), National Theatre (1990).
 The Birthday Party by Harold Pinter - UK tour, 1990.
 Anna Karenina adapted by Helen Edmundson - UK tour and World tour, 1992. 
 Mill on the Floss adapted by Helen Edmundson (co-director Polly Teale) - UK tour and World Tour, 2001. 
 War and Peace adapted by Helen Edmundson (co-director Polly Teale) - UK tour, National Theatre, 2008.
 A Passage to India adapted by Martin Sherman - UK tour, BAM Next Wave Festival, New York, 2004.
 Bronte by Polly Teale - Watermill, UK tour, Tricycle Theatre.

As a Freelance Director 2011 - Present

With the Royal Shakespeare Company  

 House of Desires 
 Romeo and Juliet
 The Comedy of Errors
 All's Well that Ends Well
 The Heresy of Love by Helen Edmundson
 A Midsummer Night’s Dream

Other 

 King Lear - Shakespeare's Globe 2017.

Film
Meckler directed the films Sister My Sister (1994) and Indian Summer (aka Alive & Kicking) (1996).

Ballet 
Meckler was the director and creator of A Streetcar Named Desire for Scottish Ballet.

Awards 

 The Mill on the Floss 
 Helen Hayes Award, Outstanding Visiting Production, 2001 (Kennedy Centre)
 Anna Karenina 
 Best Touring Show TMA/Martini, 1993
 Outstanding Theatrical Event, Time Out awards, 1992
 Best Foreign Theatre Company, Diario Clarín, Buenos Aires, 1992
 Sister My Sister
 Best Feature, Turin Film Festival, 1995
  Public Prize; Best New Director; Youth Prize : Valladolid Film Festival, 1994
 Alive and Kicking 
 Opening Film, Locarno Film Festival, 1996
 Most Popular Film, Hamptons Film Festival, 1996
 Audience Award Best Film, London Film Festival, 1997
 Grand Prix, Luchon Film Festival, 1999
 A Streetcar Named Desire  
 Best Dance Production, Southbank Awards, 2012
  Best Dance Production Nominee, Olivier Awards, 2012

See also
 List of female film and television directors
 List of LGBT-related films directed by women

References

External links
 
  Nancy Meckler at Unfinished Histories

Living people
American women film directors
Women theatre directors
American emigrants to the United Kingdom
Year of birth missing (living people)